Songs from the Great White North... is the first extended play (EP) by English rock band Noel Gallagher's High Flying Birds. Released on 21 April 2012 as part of the Record Store Day celebrations, the EP includes the B-sides from the band's first four singles, "The Death of You and Me", "AKA... What a Life!", "If I Had a Gun...", and "Dream On".

Track listing
All songs written and composed by Noel Gallagher, except where noted.

"The Good Rebel" – 4:20
"Let the Lord Shine a Light on Me" – 4:10
"I'd Pick You Every Time" – 2:06
"Shoot a Hole into the Sun" (Gallagher, Garry Cobain, Brian Dougans) – 7:53

Personnel
Musical personnel
Noel Gallagher – vocals, guitars, bass, production (tracks 1, 2 and 3)
Mike Rowe – keyboards
Jeremy Stacey – drums
Production personnel
Paul Stacey – engineering (tracks 1, 2 and 3), mixing
Amorphous Androgynous – production (track 4)
Graphics personnel
Julian House – design
Lawrence Watson – photography
Julie Patterson – photography

References

External links
 

2012 debut EPs
Noel Gallagher's High Flying Birds albums
Record Store Day releases